is a former Japanese football player. His brother is Yuya Hashiuchi.

Club statistics

References

External links

1989 births
Living people
Association football people from Shiga Prefecture
Japanese footballers
J2 League players
Japan Football League players
FC Gifu players
MIO Biwako Shiga players
Association football defenders